In 2018, Vegalta Sendai competed in the J1 League, the top tier of Japanese football. It was the club's eighth consecutive season in this competition. They also competed in the J.League Cup and reached the semi-finals of the Emperor's Cup.

Squad 
As of 14 January 2018.

J1 League

League table

Match details

Emperor's Cup

J.League Cup

Honours

TAG Heuer YOUNG GUNS AWARD 

  Ko Itakura

J1 Fair-Play award

References

External links 
 J.League official site

Vegalta Sendai
Vegalta Sendai seasons